Brackenridgia is a genus of woodlice in the family Trichoniscidae. There are about nine described species in Brackenridgia.

Species
These nine species belong to the genus Brackenridgia:
 Brackenridgia acostai (Rioja, 1951)
 Brackenridgia ashleyi Lewis, 2004
 Brackenridgia bridgesi (Van Name, 1942)
 Brackenridgia cavernarum Ulrich, 1902
 Brackenridgia heroldi (Arcangeli, 1932)
 Brackenridgia palmitensis Mulaik, 1960
 Brackenridgia reddelli (Vandel, 1965)
 Brackenridgia sphinxensis Schultz, 1984
 Brackenridgia villalobosi Rioja, 1950

References

Further reading

 

Isopoda
Articles created by Qbugbot